Trégueux is a commune in the Côtes-d'Armor department of Brittany in northwestern France.

Population
Inhabitants of Trégueux are called trégueusiens in French.

Breton language
In 2008, 2.7% of primary school children attended bilingual schools.

See also
Communes of the Côtes-d'Armor department

References

External links

Official website 

Communes of Côtes-d'Armor